Richard 'Richie' Foley (born 22 July 1987) is an Irish sportsperson. He plays hurling with his local club Abbeyside and with the Waterford senior inter-county team. Foley usually plays at either midfield or in the half-back line.

Career
Club
Foley has played at all underage levels for his club and has the notable achievement of winning county championships at every single underage grade.  He currently plays at midfield for Abbeyside. In 2008, Abbeyside reached the Waterford Senior Hurling Championship Final. However, Abbeyside and Foley went on to lose the final to De La Salle. Foley also plays for the Ballinacourty football club. In 2009 they lost to The Nire in the semi final and 2010 to Stradbally in the final.

College
Foley currently plays with University College Cork in the Fitzgibbon Cup.  Foley was part of the team that beat former champions Waterford Institute of Technology to reach the 2009 final.  Late that weekend, Foley lined out at wing back as part of the UCC team to win the Fitzgibbon Cup against University of Limerick.  Foley had an impressive game, capped by scoring a point from over 80 meters.

Inter-county
Foley has been a member of the Waterford panel since 2007. Although not featured in any matches during 2007, Foley won both the National Hurling League and the Munster Senior Hurling Championship in that year. Foley was part of the Waterford squad which lost the 2008 All-Ireland Hurling Final to Kilkenny.

Championship Appearances

References

1987 births
Living people
Waterford inter-county hurlers
Abbeyside hurlers
UCC hurlers